Taiyō is the romanization for some Japanese words, such as 太陽 for sun and 大洋 for ocean. It can also refer to:

People
A male Japanese given name
, Japanese footballer
 Taiyō Kea (born 1975), American professional wrestler
, Japanese footballer
, Japanese professional wrestler

Organisations
 Taiyō (magazine), a Japanese magazine
 Taiyo Yakuhin or Taiyo Pharmaceutical Industry, a pharmaceutical product manufacturing company located in Takayama, Gifu, Japan
 Taiyō Whales, one of the previous names of the Yokohama BayStars
 Maruha Nichiro, a Japanese seafood company once known as Taiyo
 Taiyo Yuden, a manufacturer of electronic components
 Taiyo Department Store, a now-defunct department store in Kumamoto, Kumamoto famous for a 1973 fire

Other
 Japanese aircraft carrier Taiyō, the first of the Taiyō class escort aircraft carriers
 Taiyo (Chisato Moritaka album), 1996
 Taiyō (song), the first single by Japanese band GO!GO!7188
 Taiyō, a sunflower variety
 Taiyo, a Japanese satellite launched in 1975 to study thermosphere and sun

Japanese masculine given names